The Chairman of the Supreme Soviet of the Turkmen Soviet Socialist Republic (from October 25, 1990: Republic of Turkmenistan) was the parliamentary speaker of the legislature, which was succeeded by the Majlis in 1992. From 1938 to 1990, the chairman of the Supreme Soviet was the republic's de jure head of state.

Footnotes

Sources

Political history of Turkmenistan
Lists of legislative speakers in the Soviet Union
Turkmenistan SSR
List